Ben Barclay (born 4 February 2002) is a New Zealand freestyle skier. He made his Olympic debut representing New Zealand at the 2022 Winter Olympics.

Career 
He represented New Zealand at the 2020 Winter Youth Olympics and competed in both boys' slopestyle and boys' big air events.

He competed in the men's ski slopestyle event at the FIS Freestyle Ski and Snowboarding World Championships 2021.

He claimed his career best second-place finish in slopestyle event in France clinching a silver medal at the 2021–22 FIS Freestyle Ski World Cup. His silver medal achievement at the Ski World Cup pushed him into contention for a late call-up with a possibility of being drafted into the New Zealand Olympic contingent.

He competed at the 2022 Winter Olympics and took part in both the men's slopestyle and men's big air events.

References 

2002 births
Living people
New Zealand male freestyle skiers
Freestyle skiers at the 2020 Winter Youth Olympics
Freestyle skiers at the 2022 Winter Olympics
Olympic freestyle skiers of New Zealand
Sportspeople from Christchurch